Everton is a town in Boone County, Arkansas, United States. The population was 133 at the 2010 census. It is part of the Harrison Micropolitan Statistical Area.

Geography

Everton is located at  (36.154002, -92.908029).

According to the United States Census Bureau, the town has a total area of 1.2 km2 (0.5 mi2), all land.

List of highways 

 Arkansas Highway 206

Demographics

As of the census of 2010, there were 170 people, 70 households, and 49 families residing in the town. The population density was 139.7/km2 (359.5/mi2). There were 73 housing units at an average density of 60.0/km2 (154.4/mi2). The racial makeup of the town was 97.65% White, 0.59% Native American, 0.59% Asian, and 1.18% from two or more races. 3.53% of the population were Hispanic or Latino of any race.

There were 70 households, out of which 30.0% had children under the age of 18 living with them, 54.3% were married couples living together, 10.0% had a female householder with no husband present, and 30.0% were non-families. 27.1% of all households were made up of individuals, and 12.9% had someone living alone who was 65 years of age or older. The average household size was 2.43 and the average family size was 2.88.

In the town, the population was spread out, with 25.3% under the age of 18, 8.2% from 18 to 24, 33.5% from 25 to 44, 16.5% from 45 to 64, and 16.5% who were 65 years of age or older. The median age was 36 years. For every 100 females, there were 82.8 males. For every 100 females age 18 and over, there were 89.6 males.

The median income for a household in the town was $18,438, and the median income for a family was $27,292. Males had a median income of $25,625 versus $15,313 for females. The per capita income for the town was $14,274. About 16.3% of families and 20.3% of the population were below the poverty line, including 26.1% of those under the age of eighteen and 25.0% of those 65 or over.

Education 
Public education for elementary and secondary school students is provided by Ozark Mountain School District that includes the Everton-based Bruno–Pyatt High School and the Valley Springs School District and the Valley Springs High School.

References

External links
 Map of Everton (US Census Bureau)
 Boone County Historical and Railroad Society, Inc.
 Town government information
 Valley Springs School District
 Detailed 2000 US Census statistics
 Boone County School District Reference Map (US Census Bureau, 2010)

Towns in Boone County, Arkansas
Towns in Arkansas
Harrison, Arkansas micropolitan area